The Netherlands Football League Championship 1941–1942 was contested by 52 teams participating in five divisions. The national champion would be determined by a play-off featuring the winners of the eastern, northern, southern and two western football divisions of the Netherlands. ADO Den Haag won this year's championship by beating FC Eindhoven, AGOVV Apeldoorn, Blauw-Wit Amsterdam and sc Heerenveen.

New entrants
Eerste Klasse East:
Promoted from 2nd Division: PEC Zwolle
Eerste Klasse North:
Promoted from 2nd Division: LSC Sneek
Eerste Klasse South:
Promoted from 2nd Division: Picus
Last years competitors Juliana were forced to change their name to Spekholzerheide
Eerste Klasse West-I:
Moving in from West-II: ADO Den Haag, DFC, DWS, Feijenoord and Stormvogels
Promoted from 2nd Division: HFC EDO
Eerste Klasse West-II:
Moving in from West-I: Blauw-Wit Amsterdam, HFC Haarlem, HBS Craeyenhout, RFC Rotterdam and VSV
Promoted from 2nd Division: SC Emma

Divisions

Eerste Klasse East

Play-off

AGOVV Apeldoorn qualified for the Championship Play-offs owing to a better Goal Average(!)

Eerste Klasse North

Eerste Klasse South

Eerste Klasse West-I

Eerste Klasse West-II

Championship play-off

References
RSSSF Netherlands Football League Championships 1898-1954
RSSSF Eerste Klasse Oost
RSSSF Eerste Klasse Noord
RSSSF Eerste Klasse Zuid
RSSSF Eerste Klasse West

Netherlands Football League Championship seasons
1941–42 in Dutch football
Neth